Cieszątki  is a village in the administrative district of Gmina Kobiele Wielkie, within Radomsko County, Łódź Voivodeship, in central Poland.

In the years 1975-1998 the town administratively belonged to the province of Piotrków.

References

Villages in Radomsko County